The Medical Household is the medical part of the Royal Household of the Sovereign of the United Kingdom.

It mainly comprises a range of Physicians and Surgeons to the Sovereign and to the Royal Household. None have more than a nominal or occasional role, although the Apothecaries to the Household at Windsor and London hold daily surgeries, and other apothecaries receive smaller salaries and all others receive only an honorarium.

The Coroner to the King/Queen's household investigates deaths within royal residences, but also conducted the inquiry into the death of Diana, Princess of Wales.

There are currently two Physicians to the King, a Serjeant Surgeon, a Surgeon to the King, Surgeon Oculist to the King, Surgeon Gynaecologist to the King, Surgeon Dentist to the King, Orthopaedic Surgeon to the King, Physician to the Household, Surgeon to the Household, Surgeon Oculist to the Household, Apothecary to the King, Apothecary to the Household at Windsor, Apothecary to the Household, and an Apothecary to the Household at Sandringham.

A Medical Officer to the King accompanies His Majesty on overseas tours. They are normally a senior Royal Navy surgeon.

Honorary positions 

Additionally, honorary physicians and surgeons are appointed from the British Armed Forces and in the Commonwealth. 

These titles are shared with those held by functioning Physician to the King:

 King's Honorary Surgeon (KHS)
 King's Honorary Dental Surgeon (KHDS)
 King's Honorary Physician (KHP)
 King’s Honorary Nursing Sister (KHNS)
 King’s Honorary Physicians (Civil) (KHPC)

List of Heads of the Medical Household 
The Head of the Medical Household was first appointed in 1973.

 1973–1981: Sir Richard Bayliss, KCVO MD FRCP MRCS
 1981–1989: Sir John Batten, KCVO MD FRCP
 1989–1993: Sir Anthony Dawson, KCVO MD FRCP
 1993–2005: Sir Richard Thompson, KCVO DM PRCP
 2005–2014: Professor Sir John Cunningham, KCVO BM BCh MA DM FRCP
 2014–present: Professor Sir Huw Thomas, KCVO MBBS MA PhD

References

External links 
 1982 History of Queen Victoria's Medical Household

Positions within the British Royal Household
Court physicians